Arthur Havemeyer (March 8, 1882 – November 17, 1955) was an American golfer. He competed in the men's individual event at the 1904 Summer Olympics.

References

External links
 

1882 births
1955 deaths
Amateur golfers
American male golfers
Olympic golfers of the United States
Golfers at the 1904 Summer Olympics
Golfers from New Jersey
People from East Orange, New Jersey
Sportspeople from Essex County, New Jersey